The Dutch Open is an annual golf tournament played in the Netherlands, and has been part of the European Tour's schedule since the Tour was inaugurated in 1972.

History and sponsorship

Founded in 1912, the tournament began as the Dutch Open, before a variety of sponsors resulted in numerous name changes over the years. KLM was the longest title sponsor; lasting from 1981 to 1990, and from 2004 to 2020. The tournament has been moved around the golfing calendar, but since 2010 it has been held in early September.

The event was cancelled in 2020 for the first time since 1945 due to the COVID-19 pandemic.

The event returned in 2021, with a new venue: Bernardus Golf in Cromvoirt. However the tournament name had been reverted back to the Dutch Open as KLM had decided to drop its title sponsorship duties.

Venues

Winners

Sources:

Notes

References

External links

Coverage on the European Tour's official site

European Tour events
Golf tournaments in the Netherlands
Air France–KLM
Recurring events established in 1912
1912 establishments in the Netherlands